The Rain of Sorrow is a 1965 Taiwanese film directed by Wang Yin, based on Chiung Yao's 1964 novel Fire and Rain. The film stars Wang Yin himself, as well as 21-year-old Gua Ah-leh in her acting debut.

Wang Yin handpicked Gua Ah-leh, a recent graduate of National Taiwan Academy of Arts (now National Taiwan University of Arts), from over a thousand candidates for the lead role. The film's other investors wanted a "sexier" bankable actress, but Wang wouldn't budge. Eventually Wang had to finance the film all by himself after other investors quit the project, but his selection proved brilliant. Gua Ah-leh won Golden Horse Award for Best Leading Actress for this film, and would go on to become one of the greatest actresses in the cinema of Taiwan.

Cast
Gua Ah-leh as Lu Yi-ping
Wang Yin as Lu Chen-hua
 as Hsueh-chin
Wu Chia-chi as Ho Shu-huan
Yi Li as Lu Ru-ping
Chen Ying as Lu Meng-ping
Chang Wen-hua as Lu Ehr-chieh
Wei Shao-ming as Lu Ehr-hao
Chou Mei-li as Fang Yu
Ming Ko as Lu Yi-ping's mother
Lin Wei-cheng as Ho Shu-huan's mother
Chou Hsun as Ah-lan
Lin Pin as Wei Shao-hsiung

Awards and nominations
1966 4th Golden Horse Awards
Won—Best Leading Actress (Gua Ah-leh)
Won—Best Supporting Actress (Lu Pi-yun)
Gua at that time was the youngest Best Leading Actress winner in Golden Horse Awards history.

References

External links

Films based on works by Chiung Yao
Taiwanese romance films
Films shot in Taiwan
Films set in Taiwan